Princess Maria Ludwiga Theresia of Bavaria (6 July 187210 June 1954) was a daughter of the last King of Bavaria, Ludwig III, and his wife, Maria Theresia of Austria-Este. Her husband, Prince Ferdinand Pius, Duke of Calabria, became the head of the House of Bourbon-Two Sicilies on 26 May 1934, thus she was titular queen consort of the Two Sicilies.

Marriage and issue
Princess Maria Ludwiga Theresia married Prince Ferdinand Pius of Bourbon-Two Sicilies, eldest child of Prince Alfonso, Count of Caserta and his wife Princess Antonietta of Bourbon-Two Sicilies, on 31 May 1897 in Munich. The couple had six children:

Princess Maria Antonietta of Bourbon-Two Sicilies (16 April 1898 – 11 January 1957)
Princess Maria Cristina of Bourbon-Two Sicilies (4 May 1899 – 21 April 1985) married Dr. Don Manuel Sotomayor y Luna on 3 March 1948 
Prince Ruggero Maria, Duke of Noto (7 September 1901 – 1 December 1914)
Princess Barbara Maria Antonietta Luitpolda of Bourbon-Two Sicilies (14 December 1902 – 1 January 1927) married Count Franz Xavier of Stolberg-Wernigerode on 31 May 1922. They have four children.
Countess Elizabeth Bona of Stolberg-Wernigerode (17 April 1923) married Count Rudiger of Stillfried und Rattonitz on 26 January 1944. They have three daughters.
Countess Barbara of Stillfried und Rattonitz (22 December 1948 – 29 March 1951)
Countess Marie-Gabrielle Cristina of Stillfried und Rattonitz (13 August 1950) married Franz-Josef Kirschbaum on 21 August 1971 and they were divorced in January 1975. They have one daughter. 
Countess Barbara Maria Antonia Kirschbaum of Rattonitz (13 June 1974) married Sixt Magnus von Kapff on 15 May 1994. They have four children.
Sixt Titus-Ruben Maria von Kapff (15 August 2001)
Sixt Louis-Alexander Maria von Kapff (31 August 2003)
Fiona Marie Delphine Elisabeth von Kapff (10 April 2005)
Pilar Marie Teres Cita von Kapff (13 September 2010)
Countess Pia of Stillfried und Rattonitz (1956) married Falk Achaz Krafft von Uslar-Gleichen on 30 April 1988. They have two sons. 
Valentin Franz Melchior Baron von Uslar-Gleichen (1 December 1991)
Benedikt Baron von Uslar-Gleichen (20 January 1996)
Countess Maria Josefa Gabriele Antonia Gebharda of Stolberg-Wernigerode (11 May 1924 – 14 September 1986)
Count Anton of Stolberg-Wernigerode (4 July 1925 – 16 September 2002)
Countess Sophie Marie Antoine Henrike Thaddea Gabriele of Stolberg-Wernigerode (12 December 1926 – 25 October 1987)
Princess Lucia Maria Raniera of Bourbon-Two Sicilies (9 July 1908 – 3 November 2001) married Eugenio di Savoia-Genova, Duca di Genova on 29 October 1938. They have one daughter. 
Maria Isabella di Savoia-Genova, Principessa di Savoia-Genova (23 June 1943) married Alberto Frioli on 29 April 1971. They have four children.
Vittorio Eugenio Frioli (27 February 1972) married Soraia Barbosa Silva on 7 July 2007.
Maria Cristina Frioli (17 August 1973 – 30 September 1973)
Carlo Alberto Frioli (18 July 1974) married Priscilla Raso on 28 April 2007.
Maria Luce Frioli (15 August 1978)
Princess Urraca of Bourbon-Two Sicilies (14 July 1913 – 3 May 1999)

Honours
Dame of the Order of the Starry Cross
Dame Grand Cross of Justice of the Sacred Military Constantinian Order of Saint George
Dame Grand Cross of Honor and Devotion of the Sovereign Military Order of Malta
Dame of the Order of Queen Maria Luisa

Ancestry

References

External links 
 

1872 births
1954 deaths
Bavarian princesses
Burials at the Church of Saints Peter and Paul (Rieden, Swabia)
Dames of Malta
Duchesses of Calabria
German Roman Catholics
House of Wittelsbach
People from Lindau
Princesses of Bourbon-Two Sicilies
Daughters of kings